The Mexico women's national beach handball team is the national team of Mexico. It takes part in international beach handball competitions.

World Championships results
2018 – 12th place
2022 – 15th place

Other competitions results
2022 Central American and Caribbean Beach Games –

References

External links
Official website
IHF profile

Women's national beach handball teams
Beach handball